Little White Lies or Little White Lie may refer to:

 Little White Lies (magazine), a British film magazine
 Little White Lie (web series), an online video series by StarKid Productions

Film and television 
 "Little White Lies" (Degrassi High), an episode of Degrassi High
 Little White Lie (2008 film), an Irish television drama film
 Little White Lie, a 2015 television documentary film by filmmaker Lacey Schwartz Delgado broadcast on PBS
 Little White Lies, a 1989 American television film starring Tim Matheson and Ann Jillian
 Little White Lies (1996 film), an Australian film starring Andrew McFarlane
 Little White Lies, a 1998 British television film starring Gerard Butler
 Little White Lies a 2006 UK film starring Jonny Owen
 Little White Lies (2010 film), a French comedy-drama film

Music 
 Little White Lies (album), a 2009 album by Fastball
 "Little White Lies" (1930 song), a song written by Walter Donaldson
 "Little White Lies" (Status Quo song)
 "Little White Lies" (One Direction song)
 "Little White Lies" (Florrie song)
 "Little White Lies", a song by Bruce Springsteen on his 2015 album The Ties That Bind: The River Collection
 "Little White Lie", a song by Sammy Hagar from Marching to Mars
 "Little White Lie", a song by The Sinceros from The Sound of Sunbathing

See also 
 White lie, a minor or benign falsehood
 White Lies (disambiguation)
 White lie (disambiguation)